A Spatial Data Infrastructure (SDI), also called geospatial data infrastructure, is a data infrastructure implementing a framework of geographic data, metadata, users and tools that are interactively connected in order to use spatial data in an efficient and flexible way. Another definition is "the technology, policies, standards, human resources, and related activities necessary to acquire, process, distribute, use, maintain, and preserve spatial data".

A further definition is given in Kuhn (2005): "An SDI is a coordinated series of agreements on technology standards, institutional arrangements, and policies that enable the discovery and use of geospatial information by users and for purposes other than those it was created for."

General 

Some of the main principles are that data and metadata should not be managed centrally, but by the data originator and/or owner, and that tools and services connect via computer networks to the various sources. A GIS is often the platform for deploying an individual node within an SDI. To achieve these objectives, good coordination between all the actors is necessary and the definition of standards is very important.

Due to its nature (size, cost, number of  t-related. An example of an existing SDI, since 2002, is the National Spatial Data Infrastructure (NSDI) created by the OMB Circular A-16 in the United States. At the European side, since 2007, the INSPIRE is a European Commission initiative to build a European SDI beyond national boundaries and ultimately the United Nations Spatial Data Infrastructure (UNSDI) will do the same for over 30 UN Funds, Programmes, Specialized Agencies and member countries.

Software components 

An SDI should enable the discovery and delivery of spatial data from a data repository, via a spatial service provider, to a user. As mentioned earlier it is often wished that the data provider is able to update spatial data stored in a repository. Hence, the basic software components of an SDI are: 
 Software client - to display, query, and analyse spatial data (this could be a browser or a desktop GIS)
 Catalogue service - for the discovery, browsing, and querying of metadata or spatial services, spatial datasets and other resources
 Spatial data service - allowing the delivery of the data via the Internet
 Processing services - such as datum and projection transformations, or the transformation of cadastral survey observations and owner requests into Cadastral documentation
 (Spatial) data repository - to store data, e.g., a spatial database
 GIS software (client or desktop) - to create and update spatial data

Besides these software components, a range of (international) technical standards are necessary that allow interaction between the different software components. Among those are geospatial standards defined by the Open Geospatial Consortium (e.g., OGC WMS, WFS, GML, etc.) and ISO (e.g., ISO 19115) for the delivery of maps, vector and raster data, but also data format and internet transfer standards by W3C consortium.

National spatial data infrastructures  

List by country or administrative zone. It is not complete, is a sample of National Spatial Data Infrastructure (NSDI) official websites.

See also 
 GeoSUR
 GEOSS
 GMES
 INSPIRE
 UNSDI
 GIS file formats
 GIS software
 International Cartographic Association (ICA)
 ArcGIS
 Geographic information system (GIS)

References

External links 

 The INSPIRE Directive: a brief description (JRC Audiovisuals)
 GSDI 11 World Conference: The Geo-Spatial event of 2009, Rotterdam The Netherlands
 Global Spatial Data Infrastructure (GSDI) Association
 Links to SDI initiatives from the GSDI Association website
 The Netherlands Coordination Office of UNSDI (UNSDI-NCO)
 The GeoNetwork portal of UNSDI-NCO (with over 17.800 metadata sets)
 Laboratory of Geo-Information Science and Remote Sensing
 SNIG - Portuguese National System for Geographic Information

 Journals
International Journal of Spatial Data Infrastructure Research

 Books
The SDI Cookbook from the Global Spatial Data Infrastructur Organisation (GSDI)
Research and Theory in Advancing Spatial Data Infrastructure Concepts
GIS Worlds:  Creating Spatial Data Infrastructures
Building European Spatial Data Infrastructures

 Software
 geOrchestra is a free, modular and interoperable Spatial Data Infrastructure software that includes other software like GeoNetwork, GeoServer, GeoWebCache,...,
 GeoNetwork is a free and open source (FOSS) cataloging application for spatially referenced resources,
 GeoNode is a web-based application and platform for developing geospatial information systems (GIS) and for deploying spatial data infrastructures (SDI),
 OpenSDI includes Open Source components like GeoServer and GeoNetwork,
 easySDI is a complete web-based platform for deploying any geoportal.
 Geoportal Server is an open source solution for building SDI models where a central SDI node is populated with content from distributed nodes, as well as SDI models where each node participates equally in a federated mode.

Geographic data and information regulation
Spatial analysis
IT infrastructure